Algernon is a masculine given name which derives from the Norman-French sobriquet Aux Gernons, meaning "with moustaches".

People 
 Algernon Ashton (1859–1937), English composer
Algernon Sydney Biddle (1847-1891), American lawyer and law professor at the University of Pennsylvania Law School
 Algernon Blackwood (1869–1951), English writer
 Algernon Bligh (1888–1952), English cricket player
 Algernon Borthwick, 1st Baron Glenesk (1830–1908), English journalist
 Algernon Boyle (1871–1949), English naval officer
 Algernon Buford (1826–1911), American president of the Richmond and Danville Railroad
 Algernon Butler (1905–1978), American judge
 Algernon Capell, 2nd Earl of Essex (1670–1710), English nobleman
 Algernon Chester-Master (1851–1897), English cricket player
 Algernon Collings (1853–1945), English cricket player
 Algernon Coote, 6th Earl of Mountrath (1689–1744), Irish politician
 Algernon de Courcy Lyons (1922–1993), Welsh photographer and writer
 Algernon Crapsey (1847–1927), American  Episcopal priest
 Algernon "Alge" Crumpler (born 1977), American football tight end
 Algernon Egerton (former: Algernon Leveson-Gower, 1825–1891), English politician
 Algernon Freeman-Mitford, 1st Baron Redesdale (1837–1916), English diplomat
 Algernon Charles Gifford (1861–1948), New Zealand astronomer
 Algernon Gissing (1860–1937), English writer
 Algernon Graves (1845–1922), English art provenance documenter
 Algernon Greville (disambiguation), several people with this name
 Algernon Heneage (1833–1915), English naval officer
 Algernon Herbert (1792–1855), English antiquary
 Algernon de Horsey (1827–1922), English naval officer
 Algernon Keith-Falconer, 9th Earl of Kintore (1852–1930), English politician
 Algernon Kingscote (1888–1964), English tennis player
 Algernon Langhorne (1882–1945), English naval officer
 Algernon Lee (1873–1954), American educator
 Algernon Lushington (1847–1930), English cricket player
 Algernon Lyons (1833–1908), English naval officer
 Algernon Markham (1869–1949), English Anglican bishop
 Algernon Marsham (1919–2004), English cricket player
 Algernon Maudslay (1873–1948), English sailor and Olympic gold medal winner
 Algernon Methuen, 1st Baronet (born Algernon Stedman; 1856–1924), English publisher and founder of Methuen & Co.
 Algernon Moreing (1889–1974), English politician
 Algernon Paddock (1830–1897), American politician
 Joseph Algernon Pearce (1893–1988) Canadian astrophysicist
 Algernon Percy (disambiguation), several people with this name
 Algernon J. Pollock (1864–1957), American evangelist of the Plymouth Brethren and writer
 Algernon Rainbow (1885–1969), New Zealand accountant and local politician
 Algernon Seymour (disambiguation), several people with this name
 Algernon Sidney (1623–1683), English politician and opponent of King Charles II of England
 Algernon Skeffington, 12th Viscount Massereene (1873–1952), Ulster Unionist member of the Senate of Northern Ireland
 Algernon St Maur, 14th Duke of Somerset (formerly Seymour; 1813–1894), English nobility
 Algernon Charles Swinburne (1837–1909), English writer and inventor of the roundel form in poetry
 Algernon Talmage (1871–1939), English Impressionist painter
 Algernon Thomas (1857–1937), New Zealand geologist and biologist
 Algernon Tollemache (1805–1892), English politician
 Algernon Tudor-Craig (1873–1943), English Army officer
 Algernon West (1832–1921), English politician
 Algernon Willis (1889–1976), English naval officer
 Algernon Yelverton, 6th Viscount Avonmore (1866–1910), Irish nobility

Fictional characters
 Algernon, a laboratory mouse in the short story and subsequent novel Flowers for Algernon by Daniel Keyes
 Algernon "Algy" or Q Algy, the character Q (James Bond) in the film Never Say Never Again
 Algernon Durban, a character in General Hospital
 Lt. Col. J. Algernon Hawthorne, a character in the 1963 comedy film It's a Mad, Mad, Mad, Mad World by Stanley Kramer
 Algernon (Algy) Lacey, a character and cousin of the main hero Biggles, in the series by W. E. Johns
 Algernon Moncrieff, a character in the Oscar Wilde play The Importance of Being Earnest
 Algernon "Algy" Timberlane and his wife Martha, main characters of the novel Greybeard by Brian Aldiss
 Algernon, a rogue who visits WindClan every summer with his band, a character in Erin Hunter's novel Tallstar's Revenge
 Sir Algernon, an explorer of the world who crashed his flying machine into the Alton Towers Hotel and decided to make home at the Alton Towers Resort
 Algernon Papadopoulos, a schoolboy (a nerd) in the video game, Bully made by Rockstar Games
 Dr. Algernon C. Edwards, a surgeon in the Cinemax television series The Knick
 Algernon, the name of Detective Jake Peralta's desk mouse in Brooklyn Nine-Nine
 A fictional character in Archer is called Doctor Algernon Krieger. (Krieger's actual name is Algernop, but this is likely a change to get through customs)
Aljernon Half-Dream, a character in the video game Shadowrun Returns and its sequels.

See also
 United States v. Algernon Blair, Inc, a 1973 American lawsuit regarding its breach of contract with a subcontractor
 Plies (rapper), born Algernod Washington

References

English masculine given names